The  were founded by the Empire of Japan between 1886 and 1939, seven in Mainland Japan (now Japan), one in Korea under Japanese rule (now the Republic of Korea) and one in Taiwan under Japanese rule (now Taiwan). They were run by the imperial government until the end of World War II.

These former imperial universities are generally perceived as Japan's equivalent of the Ivy League in the United States, Golden Triangle in the United Kingdom, and the C9 League in China.

Unlike Taihoku Imperial University (renamed in 1945 to National Taiwan University) in then-Japanese Taiwan, the Keijō Imperial University in then-Japanese Korea was closed by the United States Army Military Government in Korea (USAMGIK) with U.S. Military Ordinance No. 102. Seoul National University was built by merging nine schools in Seoul and the remaining properties of Keijō Imperial University (Kyŏngsŏng University). The National Taiwan University and Seoul National University are today among the most prestigious universities of Taiwan and Korea.

Members

History

Athletic competition 

See also

 Higher school (Japan)
 Designated National University
 Ancient universities in the UK
 Group of Eight, formal group of eight universities in Australia
 Institutes of National Importance, group of premier universities in India
 TU9, alliance of nine leading Technical Universities in Germany
 4TU, federation of four leading technical universities in The Netherlands
 Double First Class Universities, Chinese state group of elite universities in China
 SKY (universities), group of prestigious Korean universities
 Flagship Korean National Universities

References

Japanese national universities
 
Lists of universities and colleges in Japan
College and university associations and consortia in Asia